Crude oil washing (COW) is washing out the residue from the  oil tanker using the crude oil cargo itself, after the cargo tanks have been emptied. Crude oil is pumped back and  preheated in the slop tanks, then sprayed back via high pressure nozzles in the cargo tanks onto the walls of the tank. Due to the sticky 
nature of the crude oil, the oil clings  to the tank walls, and such oil adds to the cargo 'remaining on board' (the ROB). By COWing the tanks, the amount of ROB is significantly reduced, and with the current high cost of oil, the financial savings are significant, both for the Charterer and the Shipowner. If the cargo ROB is deemed as 'liquid and pumpable' then the charterers can claim from the owner for any cargo loss  for normally between 0.3% up to 0.5%.  It replaced the load on top and seawater washing systems, both of which involved discharging oil-contaminated water into the sea. MARPOL 73/78 made this mandatory equipment for oil tankers of 20,000 tons or greater deadweight.

Although COWing is most notable for actual tankers, the current chairman for Hashimoto Technical Service, Hashimoto Akiyoshi, applied this method in washing refinery plant oil tanks in Japan. Hashimoto is currently using this method in the Kyushu, Chugoku, and Tohouku regions in Japan. 


Seawater washing
Originally oil tankers used one set of tanks for cargo and about one third of the same tanks were for water ballast on their empty trips. High pressure, hot, seawater jets were used to clean the tanks and the mixture of seawater and residue called slops discharged into the sea, as was the oil-contaminated ballast water.

Load on top
The discharges from seawater washing were still considered a problem and during the 1960s the load on top approach began to be adopted. The mixture of cleaning water and residue was pumped into a slop tank and allowed to separate by their different densities into oil and water during the journey. The water portion was then discharged, leaving only crude oil in the slop tank. This was pumped into the main tanks and the new cargo loaded on top of it, recovering as much as 800 tons of oil which was formerly discarded.

History
Even with load on top there is still some oil in the discharged water from the slop tank. Starting in the 1970s, equipment capable of using crude oil itself for washing began to replace the water-based washing, leading to the current technique of crude oil washing. This reduces the remaining deliberate discharge of oil-contaminated water and increases the amount of cargo discharged, providing a further benefit to the cargo owner.

Crude oil washing equipment became mandatory for new tankers of 20,000 tons or more deadweight with the 1978 Protocol to the 1973 MARPOL Convention. Revised specifications for the equipment were introduced in 1999.

Modern tankers also use segregated ballast tanks and these remove the problem of discharge of oily ballast water.

External links
International Maritime Organization description of Crude Oil Washing
Scanjet Crude Oil Washing Machine

Sources
2.http://www.hts-g.co.jp/maintenance-eng.html

Petroleum production
Ocean pollution